Altamont McKenzie (born Kingston) is a retired Jamaican football (soccer) defender who spent two seasons in the North American Soccer League and at least one in the American Soccer League.  He also played for the Jamaica national football team from 1978 to 1980.

McKenzie attended SUNY Oneonta where he both played soccer and ran track from 1970 to 1973.  He graduated in 1974 and was inducted into the school's Hall of Fame in 2000. The Dallas Tornado of the North American Soccer League drafted McKenzie in 1974.  He spent two seasons in Texas before moving to the Tacoma Tides for the start of the 1976 American Soccer League season.  He was traded to the Los Angeles Skyhawks mid way during the season, and helped L.A. win the ASL title. He played in de dutch Second Division for PEC Zwolle. He retired in 1978.

He currently lives in Jamaica where he co-owns a rum distillery with fellow footballer Desmond Munroe.

References

External links
 NASL stats
 Tacoma Tides player profile

1951 births
Living people
Sportspeople from Kingston, Jamaica
American Soccer League (1933–1983) players
Dallas Tornado players
Jamaican footballers
Jamaican expatriate footballers
Jamaica international footballers
Los Angeles Skyhawks players
North American Soccer League (1968–1984) players
Oneonta State Red Dragons men's soccer players
Tacoma Tides players
Expatriate soccer players in the United States
Association football defenders
Jamaican expatriate sportspeople in the United States